Timolaeum or Timolaion was a town on the Black Sea coast of ancient Paphlagonia, at a distance of 40 or 60 stadia north of Climax and 100 to 150 stadia from Cape Carambis (modern Kerempe Burnu). 

It is located near  in Asiatic Turkey.

References

Populated places in ancient Paphlagonia
Former populated places in Turkey
History of Kastamonu Province